The 9th Congress of the Russian Communist Party took place from 29 March 1920 till 5 April 1920. The Congress opened in the Bolshoi Theatre with an introductory speech by Vladimir Lenin. The following meetings of the Congress took place in one of the buildings of the Kremlin. Present at the Congress were 715 delegates, of whom 553 had the right to vote and 162 were delegates with voice but no vote.

The congress elected the 9th Central Committee.

Agenda

The agenda included:
 The report of the Central Committee;
 A report on the immediate tasks of economic construction;
 A report on the trade union movement;
 A report on organizational questions;
 A report on the tasks of the Communist International;
 The subject of cooperatives;
 The transition to a militia system;
 The final item on the agenda was elections to the Central Committee of the party.

External links
V. I. Lenin's speeches on the Ninth Congress of the R.C.P.(B.), Collected Works, 4th English Edition, Progress Publishers, Moscow, 1965, Volume 30, pages 439-490
Communist Party of the USSR in resolutions and decisions (Russian)
Ninth Congress of the Russian Communist Party (Bolshevik) The Great Soviet Encyclopedia, 3rd Edition (1970-1979).
"On the relations between the Russian Communist Party, the soviets, and production unions."; Theses to the Ninth Party Congress, by Alexander Shliapnikov, presented by Yuri Lutovinov, as Shliapnikov was not in attendance.

Communist Party of the Soviet Union 09
1920 in Russia
1920 conferences
March 1920 events
April 1920 events